Prima Donnas is a Philippine television drama series broadcast by GMA Network. Directed by Gina Alajar, it stars Jillian Ward, Althea Ablan and Sofia Pablo in the title roles. It premiered on August 19, 2019, on the network's Afternoon Prime line up replacing Bihag. The series concluded on April 30, 2022 with a total of 2 seasons and 311 episodes. It was replaced by Apoy sa Langit in its timeslot.

The series is streaming online on YouTube.

Cast and characters

Lead cast
 Jillian Ward as Donna Marie "Mayi" M. Escalante 
 Althea Ablan as Donna Belle "Ella" S. Claveria
 Sofia Pablo as Donna Lyn "Len-Len" S. Claveria
Supporting cast
 Katrina Halili as Lilian Madreal-Claveria
 Wendell Ramos as Jaime Antonio Claveria
 Chanda Romero as Lady Primarosa "Prima" Antonio-Claveria
 Benjie Paras as Agaton Salazar
 Aiko Melendez as Maria Kendra Fajardo-Claveria
 Elijah Alejo as Brianna Elaine F. Dimaculangan
 James Blanco as Ruben Escalante
 Sheryl Cruz as Bethany "Betty" Fajardo-Howards / Maria Kendra Fajardo-Claveria
 Will Ashley as Nolan Dimasalang
 Vince Crisostomo as Cedric Villarazon
 Bruce Roeland as Hugo Almezen
 Allen Ansay as Alfonso "Fonsie" Serrano

Guest cast
 Glaiza de Castro as Maita Salazar-Claveria
 Irene Celebre as Irma Mendoza
 Mel Kimura as Carmencita "Mameng" Dela Cruz
 Eunice Lagusad as Judelita "Juday" Valdez
 Marcus Madrigal as Henry Dimaculangan
 Tina Paner as Aura
 Che Ramos as Darcy
 Diva Montelaba as Carla
 Renerich Ocon as Coring
 Geraldine Villamil as Anita
 Rob Sy as Edison
 Meng Canlas as Conching
 Maritess Samson as Sylvia
 Yuseff Estevez as Victor
 Angelica Ulip as young Mayi
 Caprice Mendez as young Ella
 Rein Adriano as young Lenlen
 Jude De Jesus as young Nolan
 Chrome Prince Cosio as Big Bogs
 Jemwell Ventinilla as Ziggy
 Julius Miguel as Uno
 Miggs Cuaderno as Coco
 Angelika Santiago as Jewel
 Dayara Shane as Erica
 Shanicka Arganda as Andi
 Judie Dela Cruz as Zita
 Anthony Falcon as Samuel
 Rob Sy as Edison
 Chanel Latorre as Dindi
 Sarah Carlos as Lorna/ Emerald
 Gilleth Sandico as Gwyneth

Production
Principal photography was halted in March 17, 2020 due to the enhanced community quarantine in Luzon caused by the COVID-19 pandemic. On September 25, 2020, Sofia Pablo left the show due to community quarantine guidelines. Filming was continued on September 28, 2020. The series resumed its programming on November 9, 2020. 

Principal photography for the second season commenced on September 27, 2021. Aiko Melendez left the series in October 2021, to pursue her political career in Quezon City.

Accolades

Ratings
According to AGB Nielsen Philippines' Nationwide Urban Television Audience Measurement People in television homes, the final episode of the first season of Prima Donnas scored a 14.2% rating.

References

External links
 
 

2019 Philippine television series debuts
2022 Philippine television series endings
Filipino-language television shows
GMA Network drama series
Television productions suspended due to the COVID-19 pandemic
Television shows set in the Philippines